Andi Ribaj (born 21 November 1989) is an Albanian professional footballer who plays as a striker for Albanian club Flamurtari.

Club career
In January 2015, Ribaj made his return to Apolonia after one-and-a-half season by signed a six-month contract. He debuted for the first time after his return in the last day of the same month, starting and playing full-90 minutes in a 2–0 loss against Partizani.

On 3 August 2015, Ribaj moved for the first time abroad as he signed a three-year deal with Liga Leumit side Maccabi Kiryat Gat. He made his debut for the club on 21 August in the opening league match against Maccabi Ahi Nazareth, and scored his first goal three weeks later during the 1–2 home defeat to Hapoël Rishon LeZion. That was his only strike of the season, as he appeared in 29 league matches, in addition one cup match.

In September 2016, he was bought on trial by fellow Albanian Superliga club Partizani, playing a friendly match for reserve team against Dinamo Tirana. However, he was not offered a contract by the technical staff after failing impressing, and eventually ended up by penning a one-year contract with other top flight club Teuta.

Ribaj made his official debut on 12 October against his former side Skënderbeu, failing to score as Teuta slumped into a 1–0 away defeat. He scored his maiden Teuta goal later on 30 November in the matchday 13 against Flamurtari, netting his team's only goal in an eventual 1–2 home defeat. Then, he scored a brace in the 0–2 away win at Laçi to give Teuta three important points against the survival relegations rivals. Ribaj finished the season with 4 goals in 26 league appearances, collecting 1300 on the field as Teuta secured another season in the Albanian Superliga. He left the team after the end of the season.

In September 2017, Ribaj was close to a move to Kastrioti of Albanian First Division, but eventually joined Vllaznia in top flight on a one-year contract. He ended a barren run of 14 league games without a goal for Vllaznia on 16 December 2017, when he headed in against Kamza at Loro Boriçi Stadium to give the home side a 1–0 lead. The match finished 3–2 for Vllaznia.

Ribaj concluded his first and only season in Shkodër by scoring 5 goals in 31 league appearances, as Vllaznia was relegated for the first time in 60 years, just one year before the club's 100 anniversary.

In September 2018, Ribaj remained in top flight, signing a contract with Flamurtari. He scored his first goal for the club later on 17 February 2019 in a 2–0 home win over Skënderbeu.

Career statistics

Honours

Club
Skënderbeu Korçë
Albanian Superliga: 2013–14
Albanian Supercup: 2013, 2014

References

External links
Andi Ribaj at the Albanian Football Association

1989 births
Living people
Footballers from Vlorë
Albanian footballers
Association football forwards
KF Apolonia Fier players
KF Skënderbeu Korçë players
Maccabi Kiryat Gat F.C. players
KF Teuta Durrës players
KF Vllaznia Shkodër players
Flamurtari Vlorë players
Kategoria Superiore players
Liga Leumit players
Albanian expatriate footballers
Expatriate footballers in Israel
Albanian expatriate sportspeople in Israel